The Jazztet at Birdhouse is a live album by the Jazztet, led by trumpeter Art Farmer and saxophonist Benny Golson. It features performances recorded in Chicago in 1961 and was originally released on the Argo label.

Reception

The Allmusic review by Ken Dryden says, "The interaction between the musicians throughout the session adds to the value of this live material".

Track listing
 "Junction" (Benny Golson) - 5:54    
 "Farmer's Market" (Art Farmer) - 8:36    
 "Darn That Dream" (Jimmy Van Heusen, Eddie DeLange) - 4:28    
 "Shutterbug" (J. J. Johnson) - 4:50    
 "'Round Midnight" (Thelonious Monk) - 10:12    
 "November Afternoon" (Tom McIntosh) - 6:16

Personnel
Art Farmer - trumpet, flügelhorn
Benny Golson - tenor saxophone
Tom McIntosh - trombone 
Cedar Walton - piano
Tommy Williams - bass
Albert Heath - drums

References 

Argo Records live albums
Benny Golson albums
1961 albums
Art Farmer albums